Cornwallis is a rural municipality located in the Canadian province of Manitoba. It surrounds the east, south and west sides of Brandon, Manitoba. Most of the land comprising the municipality is farmland, but it contains a few settlements. One of the larger settlements, Sprucewoods, sits at the north gate of Canadian Forces Base Shilo and contains a large group of the municipal population. In the past, there has been friction between the community and the farming base that make up much of Cornwallis.

The municipality is divided into six wards, each represented by one councillor. The council is made up of the six councillors and the reeve, or head of council.

Communities
 Chater
 Cottonwoods
 Sprucewoods
 Roseland

Demographics 

References 

 Map of Cornwallis R.M. at Statcan
 Community Profile: Rural Municipality of Cornwallis, Manitoba; Statistics Canada
 Rural Municipality of Cornwallis Web Site 
 Manitoba Historical Society - Rural Municipality of Cornwallis

External links
 Official website

Cornwallis